Uncle Boonmee Who Can Recall His Past Lives is a 2010 Thai drama film written, produced, and directed by Apichatpong Weerasethakul. The film, which explores themes of reincarnation, centers on the last days in the life of its title character, who is played by Thanapat Saisaymar. Together with his loved ones—including the spirit of his dead wife, Huay, and his lost son, Boonsong, who has returned in a non-human form—Boonmee explores his past lives as he contemplates the reasons for his illness.

Uncle Boonmee Who Can Recall His Past Lives was inspired by the 1983 book A Man Who Can Recall His Past Lives by Buddhist abbot Phra Sripariyattiweti. The film is the final installment in a multi-platform art project by Apichatpong Weerasethakul called "Primitive". It premiered at the 2010 Cannes Film Festival, where it won the Palme d'Or, becoming the first Thai film to do so.

Plot
In a grassy area, a water buffalo breaks free from a rope tethering it to a tree. It wanders into a forest, where it is spotted by a man holding a sickle. The man begins to lead it somewhere, while a silhouetted figure with red eyes watches.

Boonmee lives in a house on a farm with his sister-in-law Jen and his nephew Tong. Boonmee is suffering from a failing kidney; his Laotian assistant Jaai administers dialysis treatments to him. One night, while Boonmee, Jen and Tong are eating dinner together, the ghost of Boonmee's wife Huay appears. Huay, who died over a decade prior, says that she heard Jen and Boonmee's prayers for her, and is aware of Boonmee's poor health. A hairy, red-eyed figure ascends the stairs near the dinner table, and is revealed to be Boonmee's long-lost son Boonsong. Boonsong, who practiced photography, had disappeared some years after Huay died. Boonsong was searching for a creature—whom he calls a "Monkey Ghost"—that he had captured in one of his photos. He says that he mated with a Monkey Ghost, causing his hair to grow longer and his pupils to dilate, and that, after meeting his mate, he forgot "the old world".

During the day, on the farm with Jen, Boonmee asserts that his illness is a result of karma. He claims that it was caused by his killing of communists while serving in the military, and his killing of bugs on the farm.

A princess is carried through a forest in a litter. She walks near a waterfall, and gazes into her reflection in the water, which she perceives to be more youthful and beautiful than her real appearance. She is kissed by one of her servants, but insists that he imagined kissing her reflection. The servant departs, and she sits by the water and weeps. She is complimented by a catfish, prompting her to wade into the water. She makes offerings of her jewelry in return for being made to look like her reflection, and then has intercourse with the catfish.

Boonmee lies in bed near a sitting Huay. He hugs her, and asks about how he might be able to find her in the afterlife. She tells him that the spirits of the deceased are not attached to locations, but to people. Later, Boonmee, Huay, Jen and Tong venture out into the forest. Jen and Tong see shadowy figures running through the brush and leaping between the trees. Huay leads Boonmee, Jen and Tong into a cave. Boonmee believes that he was born in the cave, in a life that he cannot recall. He recounts a dream of a future civilisation in which authorities shine "a light" on "past people", causing them to disappear. Huay disconnects Boonmee's dialysis tube. By the next day, Boonmee is dead.

Following Boonmee's funeral, Jen sits on a bed, organising gifts of baht with her friend Roong. Tong, now a monk, arrives, saying that he has been having difficulty sleeping at the temple. He showers and changes from his robes to a T-shirt and jeans. While preparing to go out to eat with Jen, he is stunned to see himself, Jen and Roong on the bed, watching television. He and Jen leave for a restaurant, while he, Jen and Roong remain on the bed.

Cast
 Thanapat Saisaymar as Uncle Boonmee
 Natthakarn Aphaiwong as Huay, Boonmee's wife
 Jeerasak Kulhong as Boonsong, Boonmee's son
 Jenjira Pongpas as Jen
 Sakda Kaewbuadee as Tong
 Kanokporn Thongaram as Roong, Jen's friend
 Samud Kugasang as Jai, Boonmee's chief worker
 Wallapa Mongkolprasert as the princess
 Sumit Suebsee as the soldier
 Vien Pimdee as the farmer

Themes
Uncle Boonmee Who Can Recall His Past Lives is the final installment in a multi-platform art project "Primitive". The project deals with the Isan region in Thailand's northeast, and in particular the village of Nabua in Nakhon Phanom, near the Laos border. Previous installments include a seven-part video installation and the two short films A Letter to Uncle Boonmee and Phantoms of Nabua, both of which premiered in 2009. The project explores themes of memories, transformation and extinction, and touches on a violent 1965 crackdown on communist sympathisers in Nabua by the Thai army. Regarding the feature film's place within the overarching project, Apichatpong has said that it "echoes other works in the 'Primitive' installation, which is about this land in Isan with a brutal history. But I'm not making a political film - it's more like a personal diary."

According to Weerasethakul, the film is primarily about "objects and people that transform or hybridise". A central theme is the transformation and possible extinction of cinema itself. The film consists of six reels each shot in a different cinematic style. The styles include, by the words of the director, "old cinema with stiff acting and classical staging", "documentary style", "costume drama" and "my kind of film when you see long takes of animals and people driving". Weerasethakul further explained in an interview with Bangkok Post: "When you make a film about recollection and death, you realise that cinema is also facing death. Uncle Boonmee is one of the last pictures shot on film - now everybody shoots digital. It's my own little lamentation".

Production
Apichatpong Weerasethakul says that a man named Boonmee approached Phra Sripariyattiweti, the abbot of a Buddhist temple in his home town, claiming he could clearly remember his own previous lives while meditating. The abbot was so impressed with Boonmee's ability that he published a book called A Man Who Can Recall His Past Lives in 1983. By the time Apichatpong read the book, Boonmee had died. The original idea was to adapt the book into a biographical film about Boonmee. However, that was soon abandoned to make room for a more personal film, while still using the book's structure and content as inspiration. The stories and production designs were inspired by old television shows and Thai comic books, which often used simple plots and were filled with supernatural elements.

The film was an international co-production between Weerasethakul's company Kick the Machine, Britain's Illuminations Films, France's Anna Sanders Films, Germany's The Match Factory and Geissendörfer Film- und Fernsehproduktion and Spain's Eddie Saeta. It received 3.5 million baht in support from the Royal Thai Ministry of Culture.

Filming took place between October 2009 and February 2010, as the weather conditions allowed, both in Bangkok and the northeast of Thailand, Isan. The movie was shot with 16 mm film instead of digital video both for budgetary reasons and to give the film a look similar to that of classic Thai cinema.

Release

The film premiered in competition at the Cannes Film Festival on 21 May 2010. Theatrical distribution in Thailand was at first uncertain. "Every time I release a movie, I lose money because of the advertising and promotion, so I'm not sure if it's worth it, even though I would love to show it at home", Apichatpong said in an interview. On 25 June, however, Kick the Machine released it in a month-long run, limited to one theater in Bangkok, similar with the release of Weerasethakul's previous films. It passed uncut by the Thai censorship board, despite featuring scenes similar to those cut from the director's past two feature films. Distribution rights for the United States were acquired by Strand Releasing and the film received a U.S. release on 2 March 2011. Cartoonist Chris Ware created the poster for the U.S. release.

Reception
Uncle Boonmee has received near universal acclaim from critics. On the review aggregator website Rotten Tomatoes, the film holds an 89% approval rating based on 97 reviews, with an average rating of 7.92/10. The site's critical consensus reads: "Languorous and deeply enigmatic, Palme d'Or winner Uncle Boonmee represents an original take on the ghosts that haunt us." On Metacritic the film has a weighted average score of 87 out of 100 based on 21 reviews, indicating "universal acclaim".

Sukhdev Sandhu of The Daily Telegraph gave the film a score of five out of five stars in an early festival review. Sandhu wrote: "It's barely a film; more a floating world. To watch it is to feel many things – balmed, seduced, amused, mystified," and continued: "There are many elements of this film that remain elusive and secretive. But that's a large part of its appeal: Weerasethakul, without ever trading in stock images of Oriental inscrutability, successfully conveys the subtle but important other-worldliness of this part of Thailand". In Screen International, Mark Adams called the film "a beautifully assembled affair, with certain scenes staged with painterly composure, and also increasingly moving as the subtle story develops. Plus Apichatpong Weerasethakul is not afraid of adding in moments of surreal humour – often laugh-out-loud moments for that – which helps the pacing of the film." Willis Wong of Intermedias Review called the film "a slow, meditative and often baffling journey visually gorgeous and worth taking."

Cahiers du Cinéma featured Uncle Boonmee Who Can Recall His Past Lives on the cover of the June 2010 issue and listed it first on their annual Top Ten of 2010.

The film received a score of 2.4/4 at Screen International's annual Cannes Jury Grid, which polls international film critics from publications such as Sight & Sound, The Australian, Positif, L'Unita, Der Tagesspiegel among others. It was listed second on Film Comment magazine's Best Films of 2011 list. In the 2012 Sight & Sound critics' poll, eight critics voted for it as one of their 10 greatest films ever made; this ranked it at #202 in the finished list. Five directors also voted, making the film ranked at #132 in the directors' poll. In a 2016 BBC poll, critics voted the film the 37th greatest since 2000.

Accolades
The film won the Palme d'Or at the 2010 Cannes Film Festival. It became the first Asian film to win the award since 1997. Apichatpong Weerasethakul became the first Thai director to receive the award. The film was selected as the Thai entry for the Best Foreign Language Film at the 83rd Academy Awards but it did not make the final shortlist.

See also
List of submissions to the 83rd Academy Awards for Best Foreign Language Film
List of Thai submissions for the Academy Award for Best Foreign Language Film

References

External links

2010 films
2010 drama films
Thai drama films
Thai-language films
Films directed by Apichatpong Weerasethakul
Films about reincarnation
Metaphysical fiction films
Magic realism films
Palme d'Or winners
Asian Film Award for Best Film winners
Thai national heritage films
Films shot in 16 mm film